"Drive By" is a song by American roots rock band Train from their sixth studio album, California 37. It was released in the United States as the album's lead single on January 10, 2012, three months before the release of California 37. The song was written by lead singer Pat Monahan and Norwegian songwriting duo Espen Lind, Amund Bjørklund, the same team responsible for Train's 2009 hit single "Hey, Soul Sister".

"Drive By" peaked at number 10 on the Billboard Hot 100, becoming the band's third (and final) top 10 hit in the US. It was awarded a double platinum certification by the RIAA on July 23, 2012, for more than 2 million sales in the US. Internationally, the song became a top ten hit in 13 countries. Train performed the song on television series 90210 in the episode "Blood Is Thicker Than Mud", which aired on March 13, 2012.  Train also performed a parody entitled "Five By" with Elmo and Count von Count for an episode of Sesame Street.

Background

Singer Pat Monahan said, "'Drive By' was about meeting my wife and quickly falling in love, and being really scared about that because I was like, Man, I am not sure if this is a good idea — that something like this would happen so quickly. Because I think generally when you're looking for something big you're not gonna find it, and when you're not looking for that thing it's gonna probably show up and get you. And so, 'Drive By' was all about realizing that I have to not worry about it and just let it be what it is."

Monahan said the lyric, "Hefty bag to hold my love" was inspired by when he used to work at a restaurant in Erie, Pennsylvania. He and his friends would sneak the owner's beer out of the fridge, hide it in trash bags in the dumpster, and then take it home and drink it when their shift was over. This made him associate Hefty bags with holding things that made him happy. When the song was released, Hefty sent him several boxes of garbage bags in gratitude for the shout-out. The "shy guy" in the lyrics came from his restaurant days, when he went to a party where he was scared to talk to anyone. A husband of his coworker, who was a very large but kind man, came up to him and called him "Shy guy."

Composition
"Drive By" is a pop rock song. The instrumentation consists of "buoyant acoustic riffs and a hook-laden melody". Lead singer Pat Monahan sings in a characteristic "sing-talk vocal croon".

The song is in the key of C# Minor, and the chord structure is based on the IV–I–V–vi chord progression.

Critical reception
Billboard gave the song a positive review stating:
"Drive By" starts with a staccato guitar strum and a percussive thump that certainly recalls its predecessor, with a slight ethnic flavor that makes it recall a Bar Mitzvah reception. Frontman Pat Monahan semi-speaks the [verses] in tuneful, rap-like cadence, then turns to smooth pop singing for the choruses. The lyric, however, is a bit darker [...] Monahan pleads with enough joyful exuberance that she -- and we -- might just buy it.

Writing for Idolator, Becky Bain called the song an "upbeat tune", though noting its potential to become "as big as Hey Soul Sister" and generate similar backlash from listeners.

Commercial performance
The single has proved to be a worldwide success primarily in the band's home country where it has been certified double platinum and was the 19th most successful song on the Hot 100 chart. In the UK, "Drive By" sold 502,700 copies and was the 23rd best selling single of 2012. It reached number 6 in the UK, making it their highest-charting single there since "Drops of Jupiter (Tell Me)" in 2001.

Music video
The music video was posted on YouTube on February 15, 2012, and was directed by Alan Ferguson. In the video, Monahan portrays a character who reconciles with an old flame during a weekend trip to Wine Country, and features the other band members driving classic cars.

The video starts with Pat Monahan on a phone call with his lover, who tells her, "You should be sorry, you're the one who left. Listen, I'm gonna be late for work. Bye." Monahan then drives to Wine Country in a 1967 Firebird.

Track listing
Digital download
 "Drive By" – 3:18
CD single
 "Drive By [Song Edit]" – 3:21
 "To Be Loved" (Pat Monahan, David Hodges) – 3:41

Credits and personnel
Recording
 Recorded at Integrated Studios, New York City and at Ruby Red Studios, Venice, Los Angeles

Personnel
 Pat Monahan – songwriter, producer, vocals
 Espen Lind – songwriter, producer, engineer, additional guitars, bass, keyboards and backing vocals, programming
 Amund Bjørklund – songwriter, producer, programming
 Butch Walker – producer
 Mark Endert – mixing
 Francis Murray – engineer
 Jake Sinclair – engineer
 Jimmy Stafford – guitar
 Scott Underwood – drums
 Jerry Becker – keyboards
 Hector Maldonado – bass

Credits adapted from "Drive By" CD single liner notes.

Charts

Weekly charts

Year-end charts

Certifications

Release history

See also
 List of Billboard Adult Contemporary number ones of 2012

References

External links
 

2012 singles
Train (band) songs
Songs written by Espen Lind
Songs written by Amund Bjørklund
Songs written by Pat Monahan
Number-one singles in Switzerland
Song recordings produced by Butch Walker
Song recordings produced by Espionage (production team)
2011 songs
Columbia Records singles
Torch songs
Music videos directed by Alan Ferguson (director)
Songs containing the I–V-vi-IV progression
Songs about cars